Ilya Borisovich Zbarsky (November 8, 1913 – November 9, 2007) was a Soviet and Russian biochemist who served as the head of Lenin's Mausoleum from 1956 to 1989. He was appointed as Advisor at the Direction of the Institute in 1989 due to his age. He was the son of Boris Zbarsky, who helped mummify Lenin's body in 1924. Zbarsky was a member of the Russian Academy of Medical Sciences.

With Samuel Hutchinson, he was the author of the book Lenin's Embalmers.

He died on November 9, 2007 in Moscow.

References and sources
Ilya Borisovich Zbarsky biography

References

1913 births
2007 deaths
20th-century Russian chemists
People from Kamianets-Podilskyi
Academicians of the Russian Academy of Medical Sciences
Academicians of the USSR Academy of Medical Sciences
Moscow State University alumni
Recipients of the Order of Friendship of Peoples
Recipients of the Order of the Red Banner of Labour
Molecular biologists
Russian biochemists
Russian Jews
Soviet biochemists
Soviet Jews